Gideon Obarzanek (born 1966 in Melbourne) is an Australian choreographer, director and performing arts curator. He was Artistic Associate with the Melbourne Festival (2015–2017), co-curator and director of 'XO State' at the inaugural Asia-Pacific Triennial of Performing Arts (Asia TOPA) (2015–2017). Obarzanek was appointed Chair of the Melbourne Fringe Festival in 2015 and Strategic Cultural Engagement Manager at Chancellery at the University of Melbourne in 2018.

Gideon Obarzanek spent his early childhood in Israel on an agricultural kibbutz. His family returned to Melbourne where he went to the Australian Ballet School, graduating in 1987. He then danced with the Queensland Ballet and later joined the Sydney Dance Company before pursuing a career as a performer and choreographer with various dance companies and independent projects within Australia and abroad. In his early career period he worked with The Australian Ballet, Sydney Dance Company, Opera Australia and the Netherlands Dance Theatre.

Obarzanek founded dance company Chunky Move in 1995 and was CEO and Artistic Director until 2012. His works for Chunky Move have been diverse in form and content including stage productions, installations, site-specific works participatory events and film. These have been performed in many festivals and theatres around the world including Edinburgh International BAM Next Wave NY, Venice Biennale, Southbank London and all major Australian performing arts festivals.

As Associate Artist at the Sydney Theatre Company (2012), Obarzanek wrote and directed the stage play Dance Better at Parties. In 2013 he was awarded an Australia Council Fellowship to further research with other film, dance and theatre makers, new works to be simultaneously created for both stage and screen. In the same year he co-directed the documentary/drama film I Want to Dance Better at Parties with filmmaker Matthew Bate and won the 2014 Sydney Film Festival's Dendy Award for best short film and was broadcast on ABC TV.

Works since 2012
 Bangsokol – A Requim for Cambodia. Staging Director. Commissioned by Cambodian Living Arts and produced by The Office. Premier BAM Next Wave NYC 2017.
 Attractor. Dance/music performance. Co-director and choreographer. Produced by Dancenorth Australia, Lucy Guerin Inc. Asia TOPA, WOMADelaide, Brisbane Festival. Premier Asia TOPA 2017.
 Once Upon a Time in the Western Suburbs. VR film. Co-writer and director. Commissioned by Art Centre Melbourne and Closer Productions. Premier 2017.
 Two Jews walk into a theatre... Play. Co-writer and performer. Produced by Arthouse Melbourne. Premier Arthouse Melbourne 2016.
 Stuck In The Middle With You. VR film. Co-writer and director. Produced by ACMI (Australian Centre for the Moving Image) and Closer Productions. Premier 2016.
 L’Chaim. Director and choreographer. Produced and performed by Sydney Dance Company. Premier 2014.
 I Want to Dance Better at Parties. Docudrama film. Co-writer and director. Produced by Closer productions, Adelaide Film Festival and ABC TV. Premier 2013.
 Dance Better at Parties. Play. Writer and director. Produced and presented by Sydney Theatre Company. Premier 2013.
 There’s Definitely a Prince Involved. Ballet. Director and choreographer. The Australian Ballet. Premier 2012.

Awards
2017 Helpmann Award Best Dance Production for Attractor.
2017 Helpmann Award Best Choreography in a Ballet, Dance or Physical Theatre Production for Attractor.
2014 Sydney Film Festival Dendy Award for best short film for I Want to Dance Better at Parties.
2013 Australia Council Fellowship
 2008 Helpmann Award best new work for Mortal Engine
 2008 Helpmann Award for Glow which incorporates sophisticated interactive technology for body, sound and light won the for best ballet or dance work.
Dance Like Your Old Man a film co-directed with Edwina Throsby won best short documentary at the 2007 Melbourne International Film Festival
2005 Bessie Award, with Lucy Guerin and Michael Kantor, for outstanding choreography and creation for Chunky Move's production of Tense Dave. 
2004 Melbourne Green Room Awards for best concept and choreography for I Want to Dance Better at Parties 
a Mo Award for best choreography for Bonehead 1999
1996 he received the Prime Minister's Young Creative Fellowship
1997 the inaugural Australian Dance Award for outstanding achievement in choreography
Mr Crowther and the Wallflower, (1989) was filmed and won the Queensland Young Filmmakers Award for 1989.

Works at Chunky Move 1995 - 2011
Assembly, (2011)
Faker, (2011)
Connected, (2011)
Mortal Engine, (2009)
Two Faced Bastard, (2008) with Lucy Guerin
Dance Like Your Old Man a film co-directed with Edwina Throsby
Glow, (2006)
Singularity, (2006)
I Want to Dance Better at Parties, (2004)
Tense Dave, (2003)
Three's a Crowd, (2003)
Closer, (2002)
WANTED program - Wanted: Ballet for a Contemporary Democracy Clear Pale Skin, (2002)
Arcade program, (2001)
100% Off 
COMBINATION NO. 3, (2000)
Crumpled
Hydra, (2000)
Live Acts program
Disco.very
Soap
Antistatic
EXPORT FILE program, (1999)
All the Better to Eat You With
Corrupted
BODYPARTS program, (1999)
All the Better to Eat You With
Wet, (1998)
FLESHMEET program, (1998)
Corrupted2
Bonehead, (1997)
Fast Idol, (1995)

Further reading
'Gideon Obarzanek: Daring Dance' in Potter, M., (1997), A Passion for Dance, Canberra: National Library of Australia, pp. 79–91.

References

External links

Artistic Director: Gideon Obarzanek, Chunky Move
Matthew Westwood, (2008), Perpetual motion: Having conquered Edinburgh, Chunky Move has the world at its feet, The Australian, 13 September

Choreographers from Melbourne
Australian choreographers
Australian male ballet dancers
Living people
1966 births
Date of birth missing (living people)
Australian Ballet School alumni
Contemporary dancers
Helpmann Award winners